Chris Cross is a children's television series produced by Central TV and CINAR (now WildBrain). The series is premiered on CITV in the UK in 1994 and Showtime in the United States. Based on a British boarding school, it dealt with the shift from single to mixed-sex, and the rivalry between two male characters. It was filmed on location at Thoresby Hall, Nottinghamshire, England. It starred future Clueless actress Rachel Blanchard as Dinah.

Summary 
Set in an international boarding school in England, Stansfield Academy. Oliver Cross, a teenager, is the admired school king cool when, at the start of a new term, two things occur to change the situation: Stansfield becomes mixed-sex (or co-ed, as the US people have it) and a new teenage male pupil, Chris Hilton, joins the fray, immediately becoming popular with the girls and a clear challenge to Cross's established authority.

Neither Chris nor Cross like school very much so they decide to join forces to liven up the hitherto stuffy foundation, playing practical jokes galore. They represent a formidable team: Cross is black and has built his status on the back of his wisecracking and his abilities as a DJ; Chris is the US white athlete, a perfect student. Bossy fellow pupil Dinah is the headmaster's granddaughter.

Cast 
 Simon Fenton as Chris Hilton
 Eugene Byrd as Oliver Cross
 Rachel Blanchard as Dinah McGee
 Alan David as Mr Rogers
 Timothy Douek as X
 Tom Brodie as Mookie
 Oliver Gilbody as Charles Barkley
 Nicola Stewart as Casey Down

References

External links 
 

1994 British television series debuts
1995 British television series endings
1990s British children's television series
1990s British comedy television series
1994 Canadian television series debuts
1995 Canadian television series endings
1990s Canadian children's television series
1990s Canadian comedy television series
British children's comedy television series
Canadian children's comedy television series
English-language television shows
ITV children's television shows
Showtime (TV network) original programming
Television series about teenagers
Television series by Cookie Jar Entertainment
Television series by ITV Studios
Television shows produced by Central Independent Television
Television shows set in Nottinghamshire